

228001–228100 

|-id=029
|  228029 MANIAC ||  || MANIAC was an early computer, based on the von Neumann architecture. || 
|}

228101–228200 

|-id=110
|  228110 Eudorus ||  || Eudorus, from Greek mythology. He was one of the captains of Achilles' fierce Myrmidon troops. || 
|-id=133
|  228133 Ripoll ||  || Andrés Ripoll (born 1933) was involved in the Apollo, Apollo-Soyuz and Skylab space programs. He was the founder and manager of the Villafranca del Castillo tracking station (Spain) and the European Astronaut Centre (Germany). He has received awards for his extensive professional and research activities. || 
|-id=135
|  228135 Sodnik ||  || Zoran Sodnik (born 1957), manager of the ESA's Optical Ground Station. || 
|-id=136
|  228136 Billary ||  || William Griffith (born 1956) and Hillary U. Galkin (born 1956), avid amateur astronomers from southern California. || 
|-id=158
| 228158 Mamankei ||  || Ma Man-kei (1919–2014) was a Chinese educator and benefactor who devoted his life and finances to running schools and hospitals. He also made contributions to the development of Chinese education and medical treatment in Macao. || 
|-id=165
|  228165 Mezentsev ||  || Andrey Georgievich Mezentsev (born 1949), a Russian astronomer, solar physics expert, coronal holes researcher, lecturer in Petrozavodsk State University and astronomy popularizer. || 
|-id=180
|  228180 Puertollano ||  || Puertollano, Spanish industrial city. It is located in the province of Ciudad Real, Castile-La Mancha. || 
|}

228201–228300 

|-bgcolor=#f2f2f2
| colspan=4 align=center | 
|}

228301–228400 

|-bgcolor=#f2f2f2
| colspan=4 align=center | 
|}

228401–228500 

|-bgcolor=#f2f2f2
| colspan=4 align=center | 
|}

228501–228600 

|-bgcolor=#f2f2f2
| colspan=4 align=center | 
|}

228601–228700 

|-bgcolor=#f2f2f2
| colspan=4 align=center | 
|}

228701–228800 

|-bgcolor=#f2f2f2
| colspan=4 align=center | 
|}

228801–228900 

|-id=883
|  228883 Cliffsimak ||  || Clifford D. Simak (1904–1988), an American science-fiction writer || 
|-id=893
|  228893 Gerevich ||  || Aladár Gerevich (1910–1991), a fencer from Hungary, who is regarded as the greatest Olympic swordsman ever || 
|}

228901–229000 

|-bgcolor=#f2f2f2
| colspan=4 align=center | 
|}

References 

228001-229000